This is a list of political parties in South Tyrol, including both active parties and historical regional parties.

Parties
Current parties
South Tyrolean People's Party (Südtiroler Volkspartei)
Team Köllensperger (Team Köllensperger)
Northern League Upper Adige–South Tyrol (Lega Nord Alto Adige–Südtirol)
Greens (Verdi–Grüne–Vërc)
The Freedomites (Die Freiheitlichen)
South Tyrolean Freedom (Süd-Tirol Freiheit)
Democratic Party (Partito Democratico)
Five Star Movement (Movimento Cinque Stelle)
Upper Adige in the Heart (L’Alto Adige nel Cuore)
Citizens' Union for South Tyrol (BürgerUnion für Südtirol)
We South Tyroleans (Wir Südtiroler)
Forward Alto Adige  (Forza Alto Adige)

Former regional parties
Union of Independents (Unione Indipendenti)
Tridentine Autonomy (Autonomia Tridentina)
Italian Union (Unione Italiana)
Tyrolean Homeland Party (Tiroler Heimatpartei)
Social Progressive Party of South Tyrol (Soziale Fortschrittspartei Südtirols)
Social Democratic Party of South Tyrol (Sozialdemokratische Partei Südtirols)
Party of Independents (Partei der Unabhängigen)
New Left (Nuova Sinistra–Neue Linke)
South Tyrolean Homeland Federation (Südtiroler Heimatbund)
Freedom Party of South Tyrol (Freiheitliche Partei Südtirols)
Democratic Party of South Tyrol (Demokratische Partei Südtirols)
Democratic Union of Alto Adige (Unione Democratica del Alto Adige)
Citizens' Movement (Bürgerbewegung)
Ladins Dolomites (Ladins Dolomites)
UnItaly (Unitalia)

See also
List of political parties in Italy